WYOO (101.1 FM, "Talk Radio 101") is a commercial radio station located in Springfield, Florida, broadcasting to the Panama City, Florida, area.  WYOO airs talk radio programming.

History
WYOO began broadcasting on December 1, 1993 on 101.3 MHz as an extension of WLTG, and was branded as such (it was marketed as WLTG-FM). The station's frequency was changed to 101.1 MHz in December 1996.

Styles Media (now Magic Broadcasting) purchased WYOO in 1996. At that time the station was operating in a small room on the second floor of the Nationwide Fitness Building. The station was moved into its current building on 23rd street which also housed two of other radio stations.

Talk Radio was operating at low power and the signal was carried by a telephone line in mono. The sales people had to work out of their cars. There was no office.

Styles Media applied to the Federal Communications Commission (FCC) and received approval to upgrade the signal. WYOO bought a new transmitter, built a new tower and studio and added new programming.

In August 1998, a live morning show was put on the air, and the station carried the live simulcast of Channel 7 at that time from 5 to 5:30 pm.

Talk Radio 101 was nominated for Talk Station of the Year that year and also had record ratings and revenue.

In February 2000, the radio station was sold to NextMedia, a company from Colorado. Under the branding of "101.1 FM/The Buzz", the format was changed from a conservative one to a "liberal/hot" talk format. Shows like Liz Wilde, Tom Leykis, and Bob and Sherri were brought in, and the conservative shows that Styles Media had were cancelled. The ratings plummeted.

Seeking to revamp the schedule, NextMedia hired a new program director and morning show host, Doc Washburn. He quickly added several popular talk shows to the lineup, dropping G. Gordon Liddy in favor of Mike Gallagher and adding Clark Howard and Sean Hannity (who replaced Dr. Laura Schlesinger) to the lineup. Michael Savage had already been put on WYOO when Washburn took over. Washburn was eventually able to talk station management into adding Neal Boortz to the lineup.

In June 2002, NextMedia, offered to sell WYOO and its sister stations back to Styles Media. In April 2003, Styles Media management switched the first two hours of the Clark Howard show for Bill O'Reilly. In December 2003, they replaced Mike Gallagher with Glenn Beck. In September 2004, with WYOO enjoying its best ratings in several years, morning show host Doc Washburn disappeared from the airwaves after spending 3½ years developing an audience.

Eventually, long-time DJ Rob Stark took over the morning show. Stark lasted 7½ months and was replaced by "The Attack Machine" from Gainesville, FL. Stark eventually wound up hosting the morning show of country station WAKT (Kat Kountry) across town. In December 2006, the Attack Machine moved their show to Birmingham at WYDE.

The call sign has previously been used for an AM/FM simulcast called "U100" that existed from 1974 to 1976 in Minneapolis-St. Paul.

On-air hosts
Current notable on-air hosts include Clyde Lewis, Mark Levin, Rick and Bubba, Alex Jones, Sean Hannity, Michael Savage, and George Noory.

Notable former programming includes The Attack Machine, Imus in the Morning, Rush Limbaugh, Dr. Dean Edell, Rob Stark, Doc Washburn, Mike Gallagher, Michael Medved, Dr. Laura, and G. Gordon Liddy.

External links

Talk Radio 101 station history

YOO
Talk radio stations in the United States
Radio stations established in 1992
1992 establishments in Florida